The people listed below were all born in, residents of, or otherwise closely associated with Selma, Alabama:

Activism
Patricia Swift Blalock – librarian and civil rights activist
Joanne Bland  – civil rights movement activist
J.L. Chestnut – author, attorney, and a figure in the U.S. Civil Rights Movement
Annie Lee Cooper – long-time civil rights activist who was active in the 1965 Selma voting rights movement
Willis Nathaniel Huggins – historian and social activist
Frederick D. Reese – voting rights movement leader
Amelia Boynton Robinson – voting rights movement leader and long-time civic activist in Selma

Art
Mary Morgan Keipp – noted figure in the art photography movement of the early 20th century
Clara Weaver Parrish – artist
Alison Elizabeth Taylor – artist

Athletics
Zinn Beck – former MLB infielder; managed the first Selma Cloverleafs from 1928 to 1930, winning the Southeastern League pennant in 1930
Curtis Berry – former professional basketball player
David Beverly – former Auburn University and NFL player
Charles Davis – member of the Azerbaijan national basketball team
Cid Edwards – former NFL player
Mia Hamm – former professional soccer player
Candy Harris – former MLB player for the Houston Astros
Michael Johnson – professional football player, NFL, Cincinnati Bengals
James Ralph "Shug" Jordan – former head football coach of Auburn University
Terry Leach – former professional baseball player MLB, baseball field at Bloch Park named for him
Larry Marks – professional boxer
William Clarence Matthews – former baseball player, lawyer, first head football coach for Tuskegee University and civil rights activist
Pat McHugh – former professional football player for the Philadelphia Eagles
Ben Obomanu – professional football player, NFL, New York Jets
L. Vann Pettaway – men's basketball head coach of Alabama A&M from 1986 to 2011
Ken Pettway – American player of gridiron football
Hosken Powell – former Major League Baseball right fielder
Cal Ramsey – former NBA player
Ed Steele – former professional baseball outfielder

Business
Olan Mills Sr. – photographer and founder of Olan Mills
Richard Scrushy – founder of HealthSouth
Craig Vetter – motorcycle designer
Lulu White – brothel madam and procuress

Education
Minnie Bruce Pratt – educator, activist, and essayist
Frank Warner – American folk song collector and former YMCA executive

Fashion
Eunice W. Johnson – founder and director of the Ebony Fashion Fair

Government
David Abner – former member of the Texas Legislature
Ann Bedsole – member of both houses of the Alabama State Legislature 1979–1995 from Mobile, born in 1930 in Selma
Jo Bonner – U.S Representative from 2003 to 2013
Janice Bowling – member of the Tennessee Senate
Jim Clark – Selma sheriff during the 1965 Voting Rights campaign
William Benjamin Craig – U.S. Representative from 1907 to 1911
Suzan DelBene – U.S. Representative for Washington's 1st congressional district
Jeremiah Haralson – U.S. Representative from 1875 to 1877
Sam Hobbs – U.S. Representative from 1935 to 1951
Truman McGill Hobbs – United States federal judge
Michael W. Jackson – district attorney
Thomas S. Kenan – U.S. Representative from 1805 to 1811
William Rufus King – Vice President of the United States, U.S. Senator, Minister to France
William Lehman U.S. Representative from 1973 to 1993
John Tyler Morgan – U.S. Senator from 1877 to 1907, Major General CSA
James Perkins, Jr. – first African American mayor of Selma
Edmund Pettus – U.S. Senator from 1897 to 1907, Brigadier General CSA
Jeff Sessions – United States Senator
Terri Sewell – 2010 Democratic representative for Alabama's 7th congressional district
Benjamin S. Turner – first African American elected to U.S. Congress from Alabama (1871– Republican)
Hattie Hooker Wilkins – first woman elected to the Alabama Legislature

Literature
Sarah Johnson Cocke – writer and civic leader
W. C. Morrow – writer
William O. Walker – former editor of the Call and Post
Sheyann Webb – writer
Kathryn Tucker Windham – storyteller, author, photographer, and journalist

Military
Howard W. Gilmore – World War II submarine commander who posthumously received the Medal of Honor
William J. Hardee – Lieutenant General CSA, author of Hardee's Military Tactics used by both Union and Confederate troops
Catesby ap Roger Jones – Naval Commander, Captain of the ironclad ship CSS Virginia in its battle with the USS Monitor during the first conflict between iron warships in world history
John Melvin – first American naval officer to die in World War I

Music
Randall Atcheson – concert pianist
Kenny Brown – blues slide guitarist
Mattie Moss Clark – former gospel music singer, The Clark Sisters
Jimmy Gresham – soul musician
Johnny Moore – lead singer for The Drifters
Bill Moss – gospel music singer
Oscar Toney, Jr. – soul singer

Parapsychology
Edgar Cayce – famed psychic

Religion
Moses Anderson – Roman Catholic bishop
T. J. Jemison – president of the National Baptist Convention, USA, Inc. from 1982 to 1994
Clarence Rufus J. Rivers – priest and composer of liturgical music
Milton L. Wood – Bishop Suffragan in the Episcopal Diocese of Atlanta from 1967 to 1974

Science
Shwetak Patel – computer scientist and entrepreneur

Television and film
Gregg Hale – film producer

References

Selma
Selma, Alabama